Local Pensions Partnership (LPP) is a national UK local government pensions services provider set up and launched by the London Pensions Fund Authority and Lancashire County Pension Fund in April 2016.

LPP was established to enable public sector schemes to pool resources and improve management of their assets for the benefit of their members and employers. It is open to all members of the Local Government Pension Scheme and public sector funds in the UK.

It had £22.8bn of assets under management in June 2022 and according to its Responsible Investment and Stewardship Annual Report 2020/21 serves 609,000 members from 1800 different employers.

References 

Public pension funds in the United Kingdom
2016 establishments in the United Kingdom
Local government in the United Kingdom